Tiago della Vega  March 9, 1984  is a Brazilian guitarist. Born in Caxias do Sul, Rio Grande do Sul,  he began learning to play the acoustic guitar at the age of five.  After a year, he realized that the electric guitar was his greatest passion. He started to study electric guitar, practicing 16 hours a day.

Tiago della Vega played with the bands After Dark and Fermatha. At present, he travels around the world playing and doing workshops. He previously held the Guinness World Records title as the fastest guitar player in the world, playing The Flight of the Bumblebee by Nikolai Rimsky-Korsakov at 340 beats per minute at CES in Las Vegas. He broke his previous record on the  May 9, 2008 at EM&T in Sao Paulo

On April 24, 2011 John "Doctor Hot Licks" Taylor broke Vega's old record by playing The Flight of the Bumblebee at 600 beats per minute at the Guitar Center in Westminster, Colorado, USA.

In 2012, Rolling Stone Brasil included Vega in their list of 70 Brazilian masters of guitar and acoustic guitar.

He endorses Orange Amps and plays a custom signature Andrellis 7-string guitar which has 24 frets and a Floyd Rose tremolo, the Andrellis TDV.

Discography
Hybrid (first solo CD - 2009)
Advent of the Truth (with Fermatha - 2005)
Believe (with Burning In Hell - 2006)

References

External links
 Biography on his label website
 Official website

1984 births
Living people
Brazilian guitarists
Brazilian heavy metal guitarists
Brazilian male guitarists
Lead guitarists
Seven-string guitarists
21st-century guitarists
21st-century male musicians